State of Turkey  may refer to:

Mamluk Sultanate (Cairo) (1250–1517), contemporaneously referred to as the State of Turkey ( ad-Dawlat at-Turkīyyah) among other names.
The area controlled by the Ankara Government (from 1921 until the proclamation of the Republic of Turkey on 29 October 1923) was known as the State of Turkey.